Ptychovalva trigella is a moth in the family Gelechiidae. It was described by Philipp Christoph Zeller in 1852. It is found in South Africa.

References

Endemic moths of South Africa
Chelariini
Moths described in 1852